Laura Daniels (née Laura Thomas, born 31 May 1985) is a Welsh lawn and indoor bowler.

Bowls career

World Outdoor Championship
In 2016, Daniels won the gold medal with Jess Sims in the pairs at the 2016 World Outdoor Bowls Championship in Christchurch. In 2020 she was selected for the 2020 World Outdoor Bowls Championship in Australia.

Commonwealth Games
She was selected as part of the Welsh team for the 2018 Commonwealth Games on the Gold Coast in Queensland where she claimed a silver medal in the Singles losing out to Jo Edwards in the final.

In 2022, she competed in the women's singles and the women's triples at the 2022 Commonwealth Games.

World Indoor Championship
Laura won the Women's singles title at the 2015 World Indoor Bowls Championship defeating defending champion Katherine Rednall in the final. Daniels claimed a second singles title in 2021 by beating Katherine Rednall again, in a repeat of the 2015 final.

Additionally she partnered with Paul Foster to win World Indoor Bowl's Mixed Pairs titles in 2013 and 2014.

National
After her 2016 Welsh National Bowls Championships singles success she subsequently won the singles at the British Isles Bowls Championships in 2017. She also won the Welsh National singles title in 2018.

Personal life
Her brother Ben Thomas is also a multiple Welsh National Bowls Championships title winner.

References

External links
 
 
 

1985 births
Living people
Welsh female bowls players
Bowls World Champions
Indoor Bowls World Champions
Commonwealth Games silver medallists for Wales
Commonwealth Games medallists in lawn bowls
Bowls players at the 2018 Commonwealth Games
Bowls players at the 2022 Commonwealth Games
Medallists at the 2018 Commonwealth Games